Vékény is a village in Baranya county, Hungary, west of Szászvár in the Komló District. As of 2015, its population was 139.

References

Populated places in Baranya County